Branch Avenue may refer to:
Branch Avenue station
A name for part of Maryland Route 5, and its continuation into Washington, DC